A memory card is an electronic data storage device used for storing digital information, typically using flash memory. These are commonly used in digital portable electronic devices. They allow adding memory to such devices using a card in a socket instead of a protruding USB flash drives.

History
The basis for memory card technology is flash memory. It was invented by Fujio Masuoka at Toshiba in 1980 and commercialized by Toshiba in 1987.

PC Cards (PCMCIA) were  the first commercial memory card formats (type I cards) to come out, but are now mainly used in industrial applications and to connect I/O devices such as modems. In 1992, SanDisk introduced FlashDisk, a PCMCIA card and one of the first memory cards that did not require battery power to retain its contents. Since 1994, a number of memory card formats smaller than the PC Card arrived. The first one was CompactFlash and later SmartMedia and Miniature Card.  The desire for smaller cards for cell-phones, PDAs, and compact digital cameras drove a trend that left the previous generation of "compact" cards looking big. In 2001, SM alone captured 50% of the digital camera market and CF had captured the professional digital camera market. By 2005 however, SD/MMC had nearly taken over SmartMedia's spot, though not to the same level and with stiff competition coming from Memory Stick variants, as well as CompactFlash. In industrial and embedded fields, even the venerable PC card (PCMCIA) memory cards still manage to maintain a niche, while in mobile phones and PDAs, the memory card has become smaller.

Initially memory cards were expensive, costing US$3 per megabyte of capacity in 2001; this led to the development of the Microdrive, PocketZip and Dataplay. All three concepts became obsolete once flash memory prices became lower and their capacities became higher by 2006. 

Since 2010, new products of Sony (previously only using Memory Stick) and Olympus (previously only using XD-Card) have been offered with an additional SD-Card slot. Effectively the format war has turned in SD-Card's favor.

Data table of selected memory card formats

Overview of all memory card types

PCMCIA ATA Type I Card (PC Card ATA Type I)
PCMCIA Type II, Type III cards
CompactFlash Card (Type I), CompactFlash High-Speed
CompactFlash Type II, CF+(CF2.0), CF3.0
Microdrive
CFexpress
MiniCard (Miniature Card) (max 64 MB / 64 MiB)
SmartMedia Card (SSFDC) (max 128 MB) (3.3 V,5 V)
xD-Picture Card, xD-Picture Card Type M
Memory Stick, MagicGate Memory Stick (max 128 MB); Memory Stick Select, MagicGate Memory Stick Select ("Select" means: 2x128 MB with A/B switch)
SecureMMC
Secure Digital (SD Card), Secure Digital High-Speed, Secure Digital Plus/Xtra/etc (SD with USB connector)
miniSD card
microSD card (aka Transflash, T-Flash, TF)
SDHC
WiFi SD Cards (SD Card With WiFi Card Built in) Powered by Device. (Eye-Fi, WiFi SD, Flash Air)
Nano Memory (NM) card
MU-Flash (Mu-Card) (Mu-Card Alliance of OMIA)
C-Flash
SIM card (Subscriber Identity Module)
Smart card (ISO/IEC 7810, ISO/IEC 7816 card standards, etc.)
UFC (USB FlashCard) (uses USB)
FISH Universal Transportable Memory Card Standard (uses USB)
Intelligent Stick (iStick, a USB-based flash memory card with MMS)
SxS (S-by-S) memory card, a new memory card specification developed by Sandisk and Sony. SxS complies to the ExpressCard industry standard.
Nexflash Winbond Serial Flash Module (SFM) cards, size range 1 MB, 2 MB and 4 MB.

Comparison

Video game consoles

Many older video game consoles used memory cards to hold saved game data. Cartridge-based systems primarily used battery-backed volatile RAM within each individual cartridge to hold saves for that game. Cartridges without this RAM may have used a password system, or wouldn't save progress at all. The Neo Geo AES, released in 1990 by SNK, was the first video game console able to use a memory card. AES memory cards were also compatible with Neo Geo MVS arcade cabinets, allowing players to migrate saves between home and arcade systems and vice versa. Memory cards became commonplace when home consoles moved to read-only optical discs for storing the game program, beginning with systems such as the TurboGrafx-CD and Sega-CD.

Until the sixth generation of video game consoles, memory cards were based on proprietary formats; later systems have used established industry formats for memory cards, such as FAT32.

Home consoles now commonly use hard disk drive storage for saved games and allow the use of generic USB flash drives or other card formats via a memory card reader to transport game saves and other game information, along with cloud storage saving, though most portable gaming systems still rely on custom memory cartridges to store program data, due to their low power consumption, smaller physical size and reduced mechanical complexity.

See also

Comparison of memory cards
Hot swapping
Memory card reader

References

1990s in computing
Computer-related introductions in the 1990s
Memory card
Video game storage media